is a private university in Tsukuba, Ibaraki, Japan.

History  
In 2005 it became coeducational, adopting the present name at the same time.

External links

 Official website 

Educational institutions established in 1990
Private universities and colleges in Japan
Universities and colleges in Ibaraki Prefecture
1990 establishments in Japan
Tsukuba, Ibaraki
Former women's universities and colleges in Japan